Stagetus is a genus of death-watch and spider beetles in the family Ptinidae. There are at least 20 described species in Stagetus. They eat fungi.

Species
These species belong to the genus Stagetus:

 Stagetus andalusiacus (Aubé, 1861) g
 Stagetus borealis Israelsson, 1971 g
 Stagetus byrrhoides (Mulsant & Rey, 1861) g
 Stagetus championi (Schilsky, 1899) g
 Stagetus cobosi Viñolas, 2012 
 Stagetus conicicollis (Schilsky, 1899) g
 Stagetus curimoides (Reitter, 1884) g
 Stagetus dorcatomoides (Brenske & Reitter, 1884) g
 Stagetus elongatus (Mulsant & Rey, 1861) g
 Stagetus euphorbiae Israelson, 1971 g
 Stagetus ferreri Espaol, 1994 g
 Stagetus franzi Español, 1969 g
 Stagetus grossus White, 1976 i c g
 Stagetus hirtulus Wollaston, 1861 g
 Stagetus italicus (Reitter, 1885) g
 Stagetus micoae Viñolas, 2011 
 Stagetus montanus Toskina, 1998 g
 Stagetus pellitus (Chevrolat, 1859) g
 Stagetus pilula (Aubé, 1861) g
 Stagetus profundus (LeConte, 1865) i c g b
 Stagetus propinquus (Obenberger, 1917) g
 Stagetus puncticollis (Brenske & Reitter, 1884) g
 Stagetus sardous (Reitter, 1915) g
 Stagetus thurepalmi Israelson, 1971 g

Data sources: i = ITIS, c = Catalogue of Life, g = GBIF, b = Bugguide.net

References

Further reading

 
 
 
 
 
 

Ptinidae